

Eugen-Felix Schwalbe (25 March 1892 – 12 June 1974) was a general in the Wehrmacht of Nazi Germany during World War II.  He was a recipient of the Knight's Cross of the Iron Cross.

Awards and decorations

 German Cross in Silver on 30 October 1943 and in Gold on 7 December 1944
 Knight's Cross of the Iron Cross on 13 July 1940 as Oberst and commander of Infanterie-Regiment 461

References

Citations

Bibliography

 
 

1892 births
1974 deaths
German Army generals of World War II
Generals of Infantry (Wehrmacht)
German Army personnel of World War I
Recipients of the clasp to the Iron Cross, 1st class
Recipients of the Gold German Cross
Recipients of the Knight's Cross of the Iron Cross
People from the Kingdom of Saxony
People from Groitzsch
Reichswehr personnel
Military personnel from Saxony